The logos and uniforms of the Boston Red Sox have gone through a limited number of changes throughout the history of the team.

Uniforms

Home uniforms
The current primary home uniform is white with red piping around the neck and down either side of the front placket and "RED SOX" in red letters, outlined in blue, arched across the chest. This has been in use since 1979, and was previously used from 1933 to 1972, although the piping occasionally disappeared and reappeared. From 1973 to 1978, the Red Sox wore pullovers with the same "RED SOX" template. There are red numbers, but no player name, on the back of the home uniform.

Road uniforms
The Red Sox current uniform and cap logo set has been in use since 1946. While the home uniform has remained virtually the same since then, the road uniform has undergone several minor changes, most notably changing between red and blue lettering on five occasions.

From the introduction of the Red Sox current cap and uniforms in 1946 until 1971, the road uniforms used blue block letters and numbers. With the switch to pullover jerseys in 1972, the lettering was switched to red in the same typeface as the home uniform. The pullovers were dropped in 1979 and the road uniforms once again used blue block letters. However, the red home lettering returned in 1990, along with the home typeface. In 2009, the lettering was switched to blue yet again, but using the home typeface. In 2014, the road uniforms again switched to red in the home uniform font.

Since 1946, the blue and red lettering have each been used three times.

Alternate uniforms
The Red Sox alternate home uniform jersey is red and worn with white pants. The original version of the red jersey was introduced in 2003. "RED SOX" is displayed across the chest in blue lettering outlined in white. Like the regular home uniforms, it does not feature the player's name on the back, with numbers in blue with white trim. Originally, the uniforms had blue piping that replicated the piping pattern of the regular home jerseys. The uniforms were worn very sparingly from 2003 to 2007, being used only for Sunday afternoon home games and the 4th of July. Thus, they were not seen on national television, except in the circumstance that they were used as part of a doubleheader. In 2008, the uniforms were worn for all Saturday home games, regardless of the game taking place in the afternoon or at night. In 2009, the blue piping was removed from the jersey and they began to be worn for all Friday night home games. For the 2009 season only, an alternate cap was used with this jersey featuring the "hanging Sox" logo.

The alternate road uniform was introduced in 2009, and involves gray pants and a blue jersey with "BOSTON" in red lettering outlined in white across the chest. The numbers and name are also in red with white trim. They are also worn on most Friday road games. The alternate cap was also used for these uniforms in 2009 only.

Since 2018, the Red Sox began wearing both their red and blue alternates more often (generally, when a team does not have a set pattern of usage, the uniform used for a particular game is up to the day’s starting pitcher). As such, the uniforms are no longer exclusive to Friday games, and the team sometimes wore their normal white and grey uniforms on select Fridays. The blue alternates were worn when the Red Sox won the 2018 World Series at Dodger Stadium.

Other uniforms

For the spring training St. Patrick's Day game, the Red Sox wear bright green jerseys with "RED SOX" in white letters outlined in red across the front and the hanging Sox logo is displayed on the left sleeve. While the other uniforms all use blue caps, this alternate uses a green one matching the uniform shirt. This uniform made its regular season debut on April 20, 2007, to honor former Boston Celtics coach, general manager and president Red Auerbach, who died during the previous off-season. A similar green uniform was worn June 20, 2008, to celebrate the recent Celtics victory over the L.A. Lakers in the NBA Finals. The uniforms had a white stripe down the side and the team wore their normal navy caps. Additionally, the Sox wore a variation of the standard uniforms for Earth Day 2009. The uniform featured a white pullover shirt with a red undershirt and the team name in green. The uniform trim featured green piping along the pants and was finished out with the traditional red socks. Lastly, the hanging Sox logo was modified to feature a green recycling symbol around the logo.

On April 20, 2013, the Red Sox changed the text on their home uniforms from "RED SOX" to "BOSTON" for one day to honor the victims of the Boston Marathon bombing, which took place earlier in the week. Also, a "B STRONG" patch was stitched to the shirts, which was also worn by the opposing Kansas City Royals. Because of the hastily created nature of the jerseys, the text on the front of the jerseys was lacking the blue outline, although the numbers on the back did have it. On Patriots' Day 2014 (April 21), the Red Sox wore these modified home uniforms again to mark the one-year anniversary of the bombing. To accurately replicate the original jersey, the blue outline was not present on the front of this version either.

On April 6, 2021, the Red Sox unveiled their Nike City Connect uniform—the first of seven to be released around the league in 2021, the others from the Marlins, White Sox, Cubs, Diamondbacks, Giants, and Dodgers. The jersey is yellow with the word “BOSTON” stenciled in light blue text across the front. The sleeves are striped with light blue and white, and there is a “617” (Boston’s area code) patch shaped like a racing bib on the left sleeve. On the lower half, the uniform features white pants with a blue belt. The cap features the regular Red Sox “B” with color changes; both the cap itself and the “B” are the same light blue, and the “B” is outlined with yellow and white. The socks are yellow with light blue heels and toes, light blue and white stripes, the same light blue “B” on the shin of the sock, and the secondary “circle Sox” logo in its usual red color surrounded by black text reading “EST. 1901” on the calf. The colors, font, and style of this uniform take inspiration from the logo of the Boston Marathon. The Red Sox wore this uniform on April 17 and 18, 2021. The Sox later went on to win 5 in games in a row wearing the yellow jerseys in late September during a chase for the top wildcard spot. The team will continue to sport the previously mentioned home uniform with “BOSTON” on the front on April 19, 2021 (Patriots’ Day) and all Patriots’ Days in the years to come.

Uniform advertisements
Starting with the 2023 season, the Red Sox wore a MassMutual patch on either sleeve depending on the batter's handedness; consequently, the "hanging Sox" patch that was placed on the left sleeve of the road uniform since 2014 was removed to make way for the sponsor patch.

Uniform numbers

The Red Sox have worn uniform numbers since 1931. The team has honored several players with retired numbers, starting with Ted Williams (9), Joe Cronin (4), Bobby Doerr (1), and Carl Yastrzemski (8) in the 1980s.

Before 1950, no number higher than 46 had been worn, with the exception of 81 and 82 by Lou Lucier and Johnny Lazor in 1943, and 66 by Joe Cascarella in 1935. A number in the 50s was first worn by Bobby Guindon (51) in 1964, in the 70s by Josh Bard (77) in 2007, and in the 90s by Alfredo Aceves (91) in 2011. Number 0 was worn for the first time by Brandon Phillips in 2018, and 99 was first worn by Alex Verdugo in 2020.

, every number in the 0 through 99 range had been worn during a regular season game, with the exception of 69, 86, 87, 88, 90, 92, 93, 95, 96, 97, and 98. Numbers 86, 87, and 88 have been worn by coaches or uniformed staff members (such as the team's bullpen catcher) but not by a player. The most recent instance of a number being worn in a game for the first time was number 80 by Raynel Espinal during the 2021 season.

Caps

The Red Sox typically feature a navy cap with a red "B" which was similar to the Brooklyn Dodgers “B” in the mid 1910s to the late 1950s in ornate lettering. This has been a Red Sox standard for a majority of their existence, though from 1975 through 1978 the caps were red with a blue brim, and the "B" in blue with white trim.

In 2009, the alternate hanging Sox logo caps were unveiled, and were paired with the alternate uniforms. However, during the 2010 season they reverted to the regular "B" cap regardless of what uniform they wear.

Socks and sweatshirts
From 1936 to 2002 (with the exception of the 1974 alternate home uniform), the club sported blue undershirts or sweatshirts and tri-colored stirrup stockings, with a red anklet and two white stripes on a navy blue background on the upper sock. In 1974, the team wore red sweatshirts (and solid red stirrups) at home and traditional blue sweats with tri-colored stirrups on the road. Since 2003, the team has worn all-red stockings with both their home and away uniform sets, along with red sweatshirts, with one exception: as part of the 2009 logo and uniform redesign, the Red Sox initially wore solid blue stockings and sweatshirts with their road uniforms.  The changes drew some criticism from fans for featuring solid blue stockings, instead of red, and their similarity to the Yankees' uniforms, and the team switched back to red sweatshirts and stockings after their first road trip and the remainder of the season. While Curt Schilling notably wore stirrup stockings during his Boston career, most players have abandoned stirrups for full socks.

Gallery

See also
Major League Baseball#Uniforms
Logos and uniforms of the Cincinnati Reds

References

Further reading

External links
MLB The Show 19 Boston Red Sox Uniforms via YouTube

Boston Red Sox
Red Sox